A number of steamships have been named Delphine, including:

Ship names

fr:SS Delphine (yacht)